Parabolic coordinates are a two-dimensional orthogonal coordinate system in which the coordinate lines are confocal parabolas. A three-dimensional version of parabolic coordinates is obtained by rotating the two-dimensional system about the symmetry axis of the parabolas.  

Parabolic coordinates have found many applications, e.g., the treatment of the Stark effect and the potential theory of the edges.

Two-dimensional parabolic coordinates 

Two-dimensional parabolic coordinates  are defined by the equations, in terms of Cartesian coordinates:

The curves of constant  form confocal parabolae

that open upwards (i.e., towards ), whereas the curves of constant  form confocal parabolae

that open downwards (i.e., towards ).  The foci of all these parabolae are located at the origin.

The Cartesian coordinates  and  can be converted to parabolic coordinates by:

Two-dimensional scale factors

The scale factors for the parabolic coordinates  are equal

Hence, the infinitesimal element of area is

and the Laplacian equals

Other differential operators such as  
and  can be expressed in the coordinates  by substituting 
the scale factors into the general formulae 
found in orthogonal coordinates.

Three-dimensional parabolic coordinates

The two-dimensional parabolic coordinates form the basis for two sets of three-dimensional orthogonal coordinates. The parabolic cylindrical coordinates are produced by projecting in the -direction.
Rotation about the symmetry axis of the parabolae produces a set of 
confocal paraboloids, the coordinate system of tridimensional parabolic coordinates. Expressed in terms of cartesian coordinates:

where the parabolae are now aligned with the -axis,
about which the rotation was carried out.  Hence, the azimuthal angle  is defined

The surfaces of constant  form confocal paraboloids

that open upwards (i.e., towards ) whereas the surfaces of constant  form confocal paraboloids 

that open downwards (i.e., towards ).  The foci of all these paraboloids are located at the origin.

The Riemannian metric tensor associated with this coordinate system is

Three-dimensional scale factors

The three dimensional scale factors are:

The infinitesimal volume element is then

and the Laplacian is given by

Other differential operators such as  
and  can be expressed in the coordinates  by substituting 
the scale factors into the general formulae 
found in orthogonal coordinates.

See also 

 Parabolic cylindrical coordinates
 Orthogonal coordinate system
 Curvilinear coordinates

Bibliography

  
  Same as Morse & Feshbach (1953), substituting uk for ξk.

External links
 
MathWorld description of parabolic coordinates

Orthogonal coordinate systems